This article contains a list of all matches to be played during the 2020 Super Rugby regular season.

The season was cancelled due to the COVID-19 pandemic. A New Zealand only competition, Super Rugby Aotearoa, set up by New Zealand Rugby Union, was created in replacement to fill the gap that Super Rugby competition left.

Other like-competitions may follow in other conferences, given eradication of the COVID-19 novel coronavirus in the host countries.

Round 1

Round 2

Round 3

Round 4

Round 5

Round 6

Round 7

Round 8

Round 9

Round 10

Round 11

Round 12

Round 13

Round 14

Round 15

Round 16

Round 17

Round 18

See also

 2020 Super Rugby season

References

2020 Super Rugby season
Super Rugby lists